is the debut studio album by Japanese band Satellite Young, released on April 5, 2017, through their Bandcamp account. It features the band's first six singles, including the Mitch Murder collaboration "Sniper Rouge". The album also includes the title tracks of their EP releases Dividual Heart and Sanfransokyo Girl.

Track listing 
All lyrics are written by Emi Kusano, except where indicated; all music is composed by Emi Kusano and BelleMaison Sekine, except where indicated; all music is arranged by BelleMaison Sekine, except where indicated.

Personnel
 Emi Kusano – lead vocals, lyrics, music
 BelleMaison Sekine – music, arrangement
 Tele Hideo – stage production

References

External links
 
 
 

2017 debut albums
Self-released albums
Japanese-language albums
Synthwave albums